Sachiko Yamada may refer to:

Sachiko Yamada (swimmer) (born 1982), Japanese Olympic swimmer
Sachiko Yamada, pseudonym of Fusako Sano, a girl kidnapped in Niigata